Walk to the West
was a book published to celebrate both the sesquicentenary (150 years) of the Royal Society of Tasmania in 1993, and the event from which the book is made – the Walk to the West Coast of Tasmania by James Backhouse Walker, Arthur Leslie Giblin,  Charles Percy Sprent, William Piguenit, Robert Mackenzie Johnston, William Vincent Legge, George Samuel Perrin, and Henry Vincent Bayly in 1887 from Hobart to the West Coast of Tasmania.

Paintings
It is interspersed with plates from Piguenit's paintings made in the earlier stages of the journey.

Locations included in the paintings:-

 Lake Pedder
 Frenchman's Cap
 Mount King William
 Lake St Clair
 Mount Rufus
 Mount Gell
 King William Range
 Mount Ida
 Mount Heemskirk
 Mount Olympus

Diary
The diary (unpublished) by Walker is transcribed for the book, and meticulous annotation explains the Tasmanian conditions and environment.

It identifies characters involved in the exploration and place naming in the West Coast of Tasmania in its Lexicon of relevant place names.

Itinerary
The days and locations included:-

 17 February 1887 - Hobart to New Norfolk by train, then to Ouse by coach
 5 March 1887     - Formby (Devonport) by coach to Launceston, then by train to Hobart.

It also contains a foldout map that was current of the West Coast in 1888 - when the party was travelling.

It mentions the name of the significant track cutters and explorers of the era.

Notes

References

Further reading
 
 

History of Tasmania
Western Tasmania
1993 non-fiction books
Exploration of Tasmania